Ami Sirajer Begam is a 1973 Indian Bengali historical film directed by Sushil Mukhopadhyay based on a same name novel of  Sree Parabat.

Plot
Based on a historical plot, the life of Nabab Siraj-ud-daulah and his wife Lutfa.

Cast
 Biswajit Chatterjee as Siraj
 Sandhya Roy as Lutfa
 Shekhar Chatterjee
 Ajitesh Bandopadhyay
 Dilip Roy
 Pahari Sanyal
 Bikash Roy
 Amarnath Mukhopadhyay
 Biren Chatterjee

References

External links
 

1973 films
Bengali-language Indian films
1970s Bengali-language films
Indian historical drama films
Films based on Indian novels